Neil's Party is a 2005 British comedy film starring Andrew Casey, Lauren Bigby, Sarah Cannon, Joe Wells, Jessica Blundell, Bryn Lucas and directed by Stephen Pidgeon.  The film is distributed by Warner Bros. and Lightyear Entertainment.

Plot
Four British buddies arrange a wild party of sex, booze and rock and roll as the ultimate solution to their problems with the opposite sex.

Sources 
http://www.scoopy.com/neilsparty.htm
http://www.imdb.com/title/tt0328179/
http://qwipster.net/neilsparty.htm

British comedy films
2005 comedy films
2005 films
2000s English-language films
2000s British films